Caradrina is a genus of moths of the family Noctuidae. The genus was erected by Ferdinand Ochsenheimer in 1816. It is divided into eight subgenera, including Paradrina and Platyperigea, which are treated as separate genera by some authors.

By 1989, about 189 described species were included in the genus.

Description
Its eyes are naked and without lashes. The proboscis is well developed. Palpi upturned, where the second joint evenly clothed with hair. Thorax and abdomen tuftless. Tibia spineless. Cilia non-crenulate.

Species

 Caradrina abruzzensis (Draudt, 1933)
 Caradrina adriennea Hacker & Gyulai, 2004
 Caradrina africarabica (Plante, 1998)
 Caradrina afrotropicalis Hacker, 2004
 Caradrina agenjoi (Boursin, 1936)
 Caradrina agrotina Staudinger, 1891
 Caradrina alana Druce, 1890
 Caradrina albina Eversmann, 1848
 Caradrina aldegaitheri Wiltshire, 1986
 Caradrina alfierii (Boursin, 1937)
 Caradrina altissima Hacker, 2004
 Caradrina ammoxantha Boursin, 1957
 Caradrina amseli (Boursin, 1936)
 Caradrina armeniaca (Boursin, 1936)
 Caradrina asinina Saalmüller, 1891
 Caradrina aspersa Rambur, 1834
 Caradrina asymmetrica (Boursin, 1936)
 Caradrina atriluna Guenée, 1852
 Caradrina atrostriga (Barnes & McDunnough, 1912)
 Caradrina avis Pinker, 1979
 Caradrina azim Boursin, 1957
 Caradrina bactriana Boursin, 1967
 Caradrina baltistana Hacker, 2004
 Caradrina belucha Swinhoe, 1885
 Caradrina beta (Barnes & Benjamin, 1926)
 Caradrina bistrigata Bremer & Grey, 1853
 Caradrina bodenheimeri Amsel, 1935
 Caradrina boursini (Wagner, 1936)
 Caradrina brandti (Boursin, 1939)
 Caradrina callicora (Le Cerf, 1922)
 Caradrina camina (Smith, 1894)
 Caradrina casearia Staudinger, [1900]
 Caradrina chinensis Leech, 1900
 Caradrina clavipalpis (Scopoli, 1763) – pale mottled willow
 Caradrina conditorana Pinker, 1979
 Caradrina danieli Rungs, 1950
 Caradrina derogata (Walker, 1865)
 Caradrina diabolica (Boursin, 1942)
 Caradrina didyma (Boursin, 1939)
 Caradrina distigma Chrétien, 1913
 Caradrina distinctoides Poole, 1989 (syn. C. distincta (Barnes, 1928))
 Caradrina doleropsis (Boursin, 1939)
 Caradrina draudti (Boursin, 1936)
 Caradrina dubitata (Maassen, 1890)
Caradrina dukei Krüger, 2005
 Caradrina eberti (Hacker, 1992)
 Caradrina ectomelaena (Hampson, 1916)
 Caradrina edentata (Berio, 1941)
 Caradrina eremicola (Plante, 1998)
 Caradrina eremocosma (Boursin, 1937)
 Caradrina eucrinospila (Boursin, 1936)
 Caradrina eugraphis Janse, 1938
 Caradrina eva Boursin, 1963
 Caradrina expansa Alphéraky, 1897
 Caradrina falciuncula (Varga & Ronkay, 1991)
 Caradrina fergana Staudinger, [1892]
 Caradrina fibigeri Hacker, 2004
 Caradrina filipjevi (Boursin, 1936)
 Caradrina flava Oberthür, 1876
 Caradrina flavirena Guenée, 1852
 Caradrina flavitincta (Hampson, 1909)
 Caradrina fulvafusca Hacker, 2004
 Caradrina furcivalva (Hacker, 1992)
 Caradrina fuscicornis Rambur, 1832
 Caradrina fuscifusa (Varga & Ronkay, 1991)
 Caradrina fuscomedia Hacker, 2004
 Caradrina gandhara Hacker, 2004
 Caradrina genitalana Hacker, 2004
 Caradrina germainii (Duponchel, 1835)
 Caradrina gilva (Donzel, 1837)
 Caradrina glaucistis Hampson, 1902
 Caradrina gyulaii Hacker, 2004
 Caradrina hedychroa (Boursin, 1936)
 Caradrina hemipentha (Boursin, 1939)
 Caradrina heptarchia (Boursin, 1936)
 Caradrina himachala Hacker, 2004
 Caradrina himaleyica Kollar, 1844
 Caradrina hoenei Hacker & Kononenko, 2004
 Caradrina hypocnephas Boursin, [1968]
 Caradrina hypoleuca Boursin, [1968]
 Caradrina hypostigma (Boursin, 1932)
 Caradrina ibeasi (Fernandez, 1918)
 Caradrina immaculata Motschulsky, 1860
 Caradrina ingrata Staudinger, 1897
 Caradrina inopinata Hacker, 2004
 Caradrina intaminata (Walker, 1865)
 Caradrina inumbrata (Staudinger, 1900)
 Caradrina inumbratella Pinker, 1979
 Caradrina isfahana Hacker, 2004
 Caradrina jacobsi (Rothschild, 1914)
 Caradrina kadenii Freyer, 1836 – Clancy's rustic
 Caradrina kashmiriana Boursin, [1968]
 Caradrina katherina Wiltshire, 1947
 Caradrina kautti Hacker, 2004
 Caradrina khorassana (Boursin, 1942)
 Caradrina klapperichi Boursin, 1957
 Caradrina kravchenkoi Hacker, 2004
 Caradrina lanzarotensis Pinker, 1962
 Caradrina leucopis Hampson, 1902
 Caradrina levantina Hacker, 2004
 Caradrina likiangia (Berio, 1977)
 Caradrina lobbichleri Boursin, 1970
 Caradrina localis Wiltshire, 1986
 Caradrina marginata Hacker, 2004
 Caradrina melanosema (Hampson, 1914)
 Caradrina melanura Alphéraky, 1897
 Caradrina melanurina (Staudinger, 1901)
 Caradrina mendica Maassen, 1890
 Caradrina meralis Morrison, 1875
 Caradrina merzbacheri Boursin, 1960
 Caradrina minoica Hacker, 2004
 Caradrina mirza Boursin, 1957
 Caradrina mona (Barnes & McDunnough, 1912)
 Caradrina monssacralis (Varga & Ronkay, 1991)
 Caradrina montana Bremer, 1864 (syn. C. extima (Walker, 1865)) – civil rustic
 Caradrina morosa Lederer, 1853
 Caradrina morpheus (Hufnagel, 1766) – mottled rustic
 Caradrina muelleri Hacker, 2004
 Caradrina multifera Walker, [1857] – speckled rustic
 Caradrina nadir Boursin, 1957
 Caradrina naumanni Hacker, 2004
 Caradrina nekrasovi Hacker, 2004
 Caradrina noctivaga Bellier, 1863
 Caradrina oberthuri (Rothschild, 1913)
 Caradrina olivascens Hacker, 2004
 Caradrina owgarra Bethune-Baker, 1908
 Caradrina pallidula Saarmüller, 1891
 Caradrina panurgia (Boursin, 1939)
 Caradrina parthica Hacker, 2004
 Caradrina parvaspersa (Boursin, 1936)
 Caradrina persimilis (Rothschild, 1920)
 Caradrina personata (Kuznetzov, 1958)
 Caradrina pertinax Staudinger, 1878
 Caradrina petraea Tengström, 1869
 Caradrina pexicera (Hampson, 1909)
 Caradrina phanosciera (Boursin, 1939)
 Caradrina poecila (Boursin, 1939)
 Caradrina prospera (Kuznetzov, 1958)
 Caradrina proxima Rambur, 1837
 Caradrina pseudadelpha (Boursin, 1939)
 Caradrina pseudagrotis (Hampson, 1918)
 Caradrina pseudalpina (Boursin, 1942)
 Caradrina pseudocosma (Plante, 1998)
 Caradrina pulvis (Boursin, 1939)
 Caradrina pushkara Hacker, 2004
 Caradrina rebeli Staudinger, 1901
 Caradrina rjabovi (Boursin, 1936)
 Caradrina ronkayrorum Hacker, 2004
 Caradrina roxana (Boursin, 1937)
 Caradrina rudebecki Krüger, 2005
 Caradrina salzi (Boursin, 1936)
 Caradrina sarhadica (Boursin, 1942)
 Caradrina scotoptera (Püngeler, 1914)
 Caradrina selini Boisduval, 1840
 Caradrina senecai Hacker, 2004
 Caradrina shugnana Hacker, 2004
 Caradrina signa (D. S. Fletcher, 1961)
 Caradrina singularis Hacker, 2004
 Caradrina sinistra (Janse, 1938)
 Caradrina sogdiana (Boursin, 1936)
 Caradrina soudanensis (Hampson, 1918)
 Caradrina squalida Eversmann, 1842
 Caradrina stenoeca Wiltshire, 1986
 Caradrina stenoptera (Boursin, 1939)
 Caradrina stilpna Boursin, 1957
 Caradrina superciliata Wallengren, 1856
 Caradrina surchica (Boursin, 1937)
 Caradrina suscianja (Mentzer, 1981)
 Caradrina syriaca Staudinger, [1892]
 Caradrina tenebrata Hampson, 1902
 Caradrina terrea Freyer, 1840
 Caradrina tibetica (Draudt, 1950)
 Caradrina tolima Maassen, 1890
 Caradrina torpens Guenée, 1852
 Caradrina transoxanica Hacker, 2004
 Caradrina turatii (Boursin, 1936)
 Caradrina turbulenta (Warren, 1911)
 Caradrina turcomana Hacker, 2004
 Caradrina umbratilis (Draudt, 1933)
 Caradrina vargai Hacker, 2004
 Caradrina variolosa Motschulsky, 1860
 Caradrina vicina Staudinger, 1870
 Caradrina warneckei (Boursin, 1936)
 Caradrina wiltshirei (Boursin, 1936)
 Caradrina wullschlegeli Püngeler, 1903
 Caradrina xanthopis (Hampson, 1909)
 Caradrina xanthorhoda (Boursin, 1937)
 Caradrina xiphophora Boursin, 1967
 Caradrina zaghrobia Hacker, 2004
 Caradrina zandi Wiltshire, 1952
 Caradrina zernyi (Boursin, 1936)
 Caradrina zuleika Boursin, 1957

References

Caradrinini
Taxa named by Ferdinand Ochsenheimer